Konarak is a Hendijan-class support vessel of the Iranian Navy. It was built in the Netherlands and has been in service since 1988. Originally intended as a support and logistics ship, Konarak was overhauled in 2018, and was armed with anti-ship missiles.

Description
Konarak was built in 1988, at the K. Damen Shipyards, in Boven-Hardinxveld, the Netherlands, as hull number 1403. It was ordered and purchased before the 1979 Iranian Revolution. The twelve s were constructed in the 1980s and 1990s, six of them at the K. Damen Shipyards, and the remainder under contract in Iran. Questions were raised in the Dutch parliament over the delivery of the ships during the 1980–1988 Iran–Iraq War but as the ships were unarmed and not combatant vessels, an export license was not necessary. The Netherlands also delivered a tug and a water tanker to the Iranian Navy during this period. Konarak has been in service since 1988.

It is capable of carrying  of cargo on deck,  in its holds/tanks, and 90 troops.

Service
Ships of the Hendijan class have been used as support vessels and in logistics roles. In recent years they have been repurposed as combatant vessels with anti-shipping weapons installed. Konarak was overhauled in 2018 and was given missile-launch capability and could be used to lay mines. Konarak had no anti-missile weaponry, though it may have had a  Oerlikon cannon and four Nasr-1 anti-ship missiles. It joined the Iranian naval force based at the city of Konarak on 7 October 2018.

2020 friendly fire incident 

On 10 May 2020, the ship was struck by a Noor missile fired from the  when in the Strait of Hormuz. Official Iranian TV initially reported one fatality in the incident, but this was later revised to 19 killed and 15 injured. Konarak was involved as a tender, setting out targets for target practice for missiles from Jamaran. Konarak reportedly failed to distance itself sufficiently from the target prior to the launch and was struck by a missile. The missile may have automatically locked onto Konarak as the largest target or else been set as the target by human error. After the incident, Konarak was towed to port in order to undergo a technical inspection. Footage published by the Iranian state broadcaster IRIB showed the ship down heavily by the bow with its superstructure devastated and smoke visible from fires.

See also

 List of current ships of the Islamic Republic of Iran Navy
 
 Ukraine International Airlines Flight 752

References

1988 ships
Friendly fire incidents
Maritime incidents in 2020
Minelayers of the Islamic Republic of Iran Navy
Ships built in the Netherlands
Supply ships of the Islamic Republic of Iran Navy